TB2 may refer to:

 Baykar Bayraktar TB2, unmanned combat aerial vehicle
 Polikarpov TB-2, Soviet bomber prototype
 .tb2, file suffix; see Tar (computing)#Suffixes for compressed files